Jukka Koskinen is a Finnish musician, who is the bassist for the Finnish band Wintersun. He was also the bassist for Norther from 2000 until their disbandment in 2012, for Amberian Dawn from 2010 until 2013, for Cain's Offering from 2009 until 2014 and for Dark Sarah in 2014. In May 2021, he was revealed as Nightwish's session bass player for their world tour in 2021 and 2022, and later joined the band as their new bass player in August 2022.

References 

1981 births
Living people
People from Riihimäki
Finnish heavy metal bass guitarists
Amberian Dawn members
Nightwish members
International Rostrum of Composers prize-winners
21st-century bass guitarists
Wintersun members
Norther members
Cain's Offering members